The fourth season of Parks and Recreation originally aired in the United States on the NBC television network, and began on September 22, 2011, and ended on May 8, 2012. The season contained 22 episodes. It stars Amy Poehler, Rashida Jones, Aziz Ansari, Nick Offerman, Aubrey Plaza, Chris Pratt, Adam Scott, and Rob Lowe, with supporting performances from Jim O'Heir and Retta.

As with past seasons, it focuses on Leslie Knope (Amy Poehler) and her staff at the parks and recreation department of the fictional Indiana town of Pawnee. However, this season features an overarching story arc, beginning in the first episode and culminating in the finale, where Leslie runs for the city council of Pawnee.

Cast

Main
 Amy Poehler as Leslie Knope, a mid-level bureaucrat with a strong love of her home town of Pawnee, who has not let politics dampen her sense of optimism; her ultimate goal is to become President of the United States. Poehler departed from the NBC sketch comedy series Saturday Night Live, where she was a cast member for nearly seven years, to star in Parks and Recreation. It was only after she was cast that Daniels and Schur established the general concept of the show and the script for the pilot was written.
 Rashida Jones as Ann Perkins, a nurse and political outsider who gradually becomes more involved in Pawnee government through her friendship with Leslie. Jones was among the first to be cast by Daniels and Schur in 2008, when the series was still being considered as a spin-off to The Office, where Jones had played Jim Halpert's girlfriend Karen Filippelli, who formerly worked at the Stamford Branch but was soon transferred to the Scranton Branch in the 3rd season.
 Aziz Ansari as Tom Haverford, Leslie's sarcastic and underachieving subordinate, who eventually begins to consider leaving his city hall job to pursue his own entrepreneurial interests. As with Jones, Daniels and Schur had intended to cast Ansari from the earliest stages of the development of Parks and Recreation.
 Nick Offerman as Ron Swanson, the parks and recreation director who, as a libertarian, believes in as small a government as possible. As such, Ron strives to make his department as ineffective as possible, and favors hiring employees who do not care about their jobs or are poor at them. Nevertheless, Ron consistently demonstrates that he secretly cares deeply about his fellow co-workers.
 Aubrey Plaza as April Ludgate, a cynical and uninterested parks department intern who eventually becomes the perfect assistant for Ron. The role was written specifically for Plaza; after meeting her, casting director Allison Jones told Schur, "I just met the weirdest girl I've ever met in my life. You have to meet her and put her on your show."
 Chris Pratt as Andy Dwyer, a goofy and dim-witted but lovable slacker. Pratt was originally intended to be a guest star and the character Andy was initially meant to appear only in the first season, but the producers liked Pratt so much that, almost immediately after casting him, they decided to make him a regular cast member starting with season two.
 Adam Scott as Ben Wyatt, a brilliant but socially awkward government official trying to redeem his past as a failed mayor in his youth. Scott left his starring role on the Starz comedy series Party Down to join the show.
 Rob Lowe as Chris Traeger, an excessively positive and extremely health-conscious government official. Unlike Scott, Lowe was originally expected to depart after a string of guest appearances, but later signed a multi-year contract to become a regular cast member.

Starring
 Jim O'Heir as Jerry Gergich, the office scapegoat and overall klutz, with unbelievably attractive daughters and wife.
 Retta as Donna Meagle, who's sassy and savvy and has little patience for stupidity.

Episodes

 denotes an extended episode.
 Episodes 20–22 premiered on Citytv two days prior to airing on NBC. The NBC airdates and ratings are listed.

Reception
Like the two previous seasons, the fourth season of Parks and Recreation received highly positive reviews. The show's fourth season holds a 100% rating on Rotten Tomatoes. Alan Sepinwall of HitFix said the fourth season was "funny and touching in all the best Parks and Rec ways." Some of the more critically acclaimed episodes of the season included "The Debate" and "Win, Lose, or Draw". Matt Fowler of IGN said in regard to the finale that "Parks and Recreation continues its streak of leaving a season on a strong note with "Win, Lose or Draw" - an episode that hit the right spots comedically while also, you know, sneaking up on me emotionally." The fourth season also received three Primetime Emmy Award nominations; Lead Actress in a Comedy Series for Amy Poehler, and Outstanding Writing in a Comedy Series for the episodes "The Debate" (also for Poehler) and "Win, Lose, or Draw" for Michael Schur.

Production
At the March 2012 PaleyFest, series co-creator Michael Schur revealed that three different season endings were filmed because "we want to make sure that the one we are choosing is the right [one] and we reserve the right to change our minds and also partly just to confuse people," he said, adding that "there may be a last-minute switch".

References

External links
Official Parks and Recreation site at NBC.com

4
2011 American television seasons
2012 American television seasons